Hamid Reza Zouravand (born 13 January 1990) is an Iranian race walker. He competed in the men's 20 kilometres walk at the 2016 Summer Olympics.

References

1990 births
Living people
Iranian male athletes
Iranian racewalkers
Olympic athletes of Iran
Athletes (track and field) at the 2016 Summer Olympics
Place of birth missing (living people)